Kenneth Seymour Webb (16 October 1885 New York City – 6 March 1966 Hollywood, California) was an American film director, screenwriter, and composer noted for directing a number of films in the early age of the American film industry. He helped write the Gay Divorce along with Samuel Hoffenstein.

Selected songs 
 "You and Me and You" (1919)
 Kenneth Webb (words)
 Roy Webb (music)

Career 
Webb, beginning around 1910, became a sketch writer and director for vaudeville stage.  In 1913, he began writing scenarios for the Vitagraph Company.  From 1918 to 1919, he was a writer and director for Vitagraph.  From 1919 to 1938, Webb was a writer and director, first with the Famous Players Film Company, then with Whitman Bennett (a production company) and Associated First National Theatres, Inc. (Bennett's distributor), then Fox Film Corporation, then Whitman Bennett (production company) and United Artists (Bennett's distributor), then Burr & Company, then Pathe, then Lee de Forest, Inspiration Pictures (fr), Tiffany Pictures, and then FitzPatrick Pictures. Webb wrote for legitimate stage since 1924. Since 1933, Webb was a radio writer and producer with Batten Barton Durstine & Osborn, Inc., and since 1953, was its Western editor.

From 1943 to 1943, Webb was a lecturer at New York University of radio writing and production.

Partial filmography 
As director

Marie, Ltd. (1919)

Will You Be Staying for Supper? (1919)

Sinners (1920)

The Stolen Kiss (1920)

The Master Mind (1920)

The Devil's Garden (1920)

The Truth About Husbands (it) (1920)

The Fear Market (1920)
Realart Pictures Corporation (producer and distributor)

The Great Adventure (1921)
Whitman Bennett (producer)
Associated First National Pictures, Inc. (distributor)

Jim the Penman (1921)

Salvation Nell (1921)

Fair Lady (1922)

 How Women Love (1922)

The Daring Years (1923)

The Beautiful City (1925)

Just Suppose (1926)

Education 
Webb attended The Collegiate School on the Upper West Side of Manhattan.  He went on to study at Columbia University, earning a Bachelor of Arts degree in 1906.

Professional and fraternal associations 
 Society of Cincinnati
 The Lambs, joined 1913
 ASCAP, 1914 charter member
 Songwriters Protective Association
 Actors' Equity Association
 Motion Picture Directors Association (Eastern President 1923–1925; member of council 1935–1950)
 Radio Directors Guild
 Alpha Chi Rho

Family 
Kenneth Webb was one of children born to the marriage of William Edward Webb (1844–1915) and Juliette Seymour Bell (1863–1930). Kenneth Webb married, on September 20, 1920, silent film actress Lorraine Frost (maiden; 1897–1993) in Manhattan, New York.  His brother, Roy Webb, also composer and film director, was one of his chief collaborators.

References

External links

1880s births
1966 deaths
American male screenwriters
American male composers
20th-century American composers
ASCAP composers and authors
Collegiate School (New York) alumni
Columbia College (New York) alumni
Film directors from New York City
Screenwriters from New York (state)
20th-century American male musicians
20th-century American male writers
20th-century American screenwriters